The 2017 NWSL College Draft was the fifth annual meeting of National Women's Soccer League (NWSL) franchises to select eligible college players. It was held on January 12, 2017 at the National Soccer Coaches Association of America Convention in Los Angeles, California.

Format
Draft order was determined by the final 2016 regular season standings.

Results

Key

Picks

Notable undrafted players
Below is a list of undrafted rookies who appeared in a competitive NWSL game in 2017.

Trades
Round 1:

Round 2:

Round 3:

Round 4:

Summary
In 2017, a total of 22 colleges had players selected. Of these, five had a player drafted to the NWSL for the first time: Clemson, Harvard, Minnesota, Ohio State and UConn.

Schools with multiple draft selections

Selections by college athletic conference

Selections by position

See also
 List of NWSL drafts
 List of National Women's Soccer League draftees by college team
 2016 National Women's Soccer League season

References

External links
 2017 NWSL College Draft on YouTube
 Official 2017 NWSL College Draft Results
 Official list of draft-eligible players

National Women's Soccer League drafts
College Draft
NWSL College Draft
NWSL College Draft
Soccer in Los Angeles
Events in Los Angeles
NWSL College Draft